A list of films produced in the Soviet Union in 1944 (see 1944 in film).

1944

See also
1944 in the Soviet Union

External links
 Soviet films of 1944 at the Internet Movie Database

1944
Soviet
Films